Hashemabad (also Romanized as Hāshemābād) is a village in Chahak Rural District, in the Central District of Khatam County, Yazd Province, Iran. At the 2006 census, its population was 668, in 153 families.

References 

Populated places in Khatam County